The term irregularities or exceptions in Interlingua refers to deviations from the logical rules in a few grammatical constructions in the international auxiliary language Interlingua. These oddities are a part of the standard grammar. These special cases have crept into the language as a result of the effort to keep it naturalistic. Most of these irregularities also exist in Interlingua's source languages; English, French, Italian, Spanish, Portuguese, and to a lesser extent German and Russian. This feature of the language makes Interlingua more familiar to the speakers of source languages. And at the same time, it makes the language more difficult for others.

The speakers of the source languages do not perceive all deviations as irregular. For instance, Interlingua has three different words for English "am" (so), "is" (es) and "are" (son). While most English speakers will not find any thing abnormal about it, speakers of a few other languages may find the use of three words to express the concept of 'simple present' as unnecessary.

Interlingua is notable in the sense that unlike most auxiliary languages, that seek to minimise or eliminate any irregular aspects, Interlingua takes a flexible approach. It is mandatory to use certain exceptions in Interlingua while others have been kept optional.

Mandatory exceptions

Pronunciation
Interlingua does not have a 'one letter one sound' orthography. As in English, several letters can be pronounced in different ways; depending on where they are in a word. For instance, the letter C can be pronounced as either /k/ (canto) or /ts/ (cento). Here is a list of other mandatory exceptions in pronunciation:

Besides, there are also unassimilated loan words that retain their original pronunciation and spelling.

Diacritics are permitted when they do not influence the pronunciation of the word borrowed into Interlingua. Common examples of such words are radios Röntgen (X rays) and kümmel.

Contractions

Just as in English, where I am is usually contracted to I'm and he is to he's, such contractions are also found in Interlingua and these two are compulsory to observe:

Plurals

Plurals can be formed in three different ways depending on the ending of a noun.

There are also irregular plurals that occur in loan words. The common ones are tests (from 'test'), addenda (from 'addendum') and lieder (from 'lied').

Numbers

Parts of speech

 Not all adverbs are derived from adjectives.
 If an adjective ends with -c, an adverb derived from it takes -amente (instead of -mente).
 Sia is the imperative form of esser ('to be'): Sia contente! 'Be content!'

Optional

Pronunciation

Verbs

Optional short forms
ha for habe, 'has', 'have'
va for vade, 'goes', 'go'
es for esse, 'is', 'am', 'are'

Alternative forms of esser
Note. These forms are rarely used.
so for (io) es
son for (nos/vos/illes/-as/-os) es
era for esseva
sera for essera
serea for esserea

Comparative and superlative adjectives
(le) minor instead of (le) plus parve
(le) major instead of (le) plus magne
(le) melior instead of (le) plus bon
(le) pejor instead of (le) plus mal
minime instead of le plus parve or le minor
maxime instead of "le plus magne" or "le major"
optime instead of le plus bon or le melior
pessime instead of le plus mal or le pejor

References

External links
"a grammar of interlingua" by Alexander Gode & Hugh Blair
Grammatica de interlingua

Interlingua